Valentina is an open source pattern drafting software tool, designed to be the foundation of a new stack of open source tools to remake the garment industry. The program was named after mother of the founder Roman Telezhinsky, a cutter by profession, who gave him the idea for the project. The main idea of the software package for creating clothing patterns is in combining new technologies with old methods of designing of patterns. The main feature is the work with parametric patterns.

The project was started in 2013 by Roman Telezhinsky (Ukraine) and Susan Spencer (USA). The introduction of parametric design to software for end-users greatly simplified making adjustments, as well as refitting an existing design to a completely different person. The support for over 50 pattern-making systems made the project somewhat popular with designers of contemporary clothes as well as the historical recreation community, since a significant part of the supported systems cover Victorian tailoring, as well as garment cutting from even earlier centuries.

Small-scale production and custom production of clothing 
According to the authors, the production of small-scale and custom-made garments is essential for a long-term sustainable future, maintaining small and medium-sized textile manufacturers (weaving and spinning), enabling independent and small designers and entrepreneurs to expand production so that they can live decently, rebuilding local clothing areas and the reduction or elimination of slave labor.

Division of the original project 
It was in the second half of 2017 when the project was divided into two separated projects. The results of such development (new forks) are named Valentina and Seamly2D. They come from previously discovered differences concerning the development, the role of users, the amount of contribution to the project from community members and communication between the founders of the software.

References

Free and open-source software